Keith  Muxlow (October 12, 1933 – November 21, 2017) was a Republican member of the Michigan House of Representatives from 1981 through 1992.

A native of Brown City, Muxlow graduated from Brown City High School. After high school, he served in the United States Army in from 1955 to 1957 as a radio operator. He was the co-owner and manager of the Brown City Industrial Park before being elected to the city council in 1969, and eventually becoming mayor three years later. After eight years as mayor, Muxlow was elected to the House in 1980 where he served six terms.

Muxlow's brother is former State Representative Paul Muxlow.

References

1933 births
2017 deaths
Republican Party members of the Michigan House of Representatives
United States Army soldiers
People from Brown City, Michigan
Mayors of places in Michigan
20th-century American politicians